Alexander "Alx" Danielsson (born 1 April 1981) is a Swedish racing driver and the 2006 champion of the Formula Renault 3.5 Series. He currently competes in the Swedish V8 Thundercar Series and as a fill-in driver on the Monster Jam circuit.

Career

Danielsson's career started in karting in 1998, where he stayed until 1999 before moving up to Formula Ford. In 2004 Danielsson progressed to Formula Renault V6 in Europe and Asia before moving onto the Formula Renault 3.5 Series in Europe.

In 2006 he was racing in the Formula Renault 3.5 Series for the British team Comtec Racing and doing exceptionally well. After suffering two hard crashes that could have ended his season at the Spa circuit in Belgium, he managed to take a double win at Donington on September 9 and 10 2006. He was then able to follow up the victories with a third straight victory at Le Mans on September 30 and a fourth victory in Barcelona on October 28. The following day he clinched the FR3.5 Series title via a fifth place in the last race of the season.

In May 2012 Danielsson Motorsport announced that they would be shutting down their race team. This allowed Alx to put full focus on his own racing career.

In 2013 he competed in the Swedish V8 Thundercar Series, and in March he attempted to make his NASCAR debut in NASCAR K&N Pro Series East at Bristol Motor Speedway, but he failed to qualify. So in August Danielsson made his NASCAR debut in America, driving No. 73 Chevrolet Camaro for Creation-Cope Racing in the Nationwide Series at the Mid-Ohio Sports Car Course.

Danielsson also competed in ARCA Racing Series between 2014 and 2016.

He's also drive monster trucks in Monster Jam. In 2017 he won his first Racing and Freestyle title.

Motorsports career results

Formula Renault 3.5 Series
(key) (Races in bold indicate pole position) (Races in italics indicate fastest lap)

NASCAR 
(key) (Bold – Pole position awarded by qualifying time. Italics – Pole position earned by points standings or practice time. * – Most laps led.)

Nationwide Series

ARCA Racing Series
(key) (Bold – Pole position awarded by qualifying time. Italics – Pole position earned by points standings or practice time. * – Most laps led.)

FIA World Rallycross Championship results

Supercar

References

External links
 
 
 Alx Danielsson career statistics at Driver Database

1981 births
Living people
Swedish racing drivers
Formula Renault V6 Eurocup drivers
Formula Ford drivers
World Series Formula V8 3.5 drivers
Porsche Supercup drivers
World Rallycross Championship drivers
NASCAR drivers
ARCA Menards Series drivers
People from Östersund
Sportspeople from Jämtland County
DAMS drivers
Comtec Racing drivers
Porsche Carrera Cup Germany drivers